Alassane Seydou Lancina (born 9 September 1993) is a Nigerien swimmer. He competed in the men's 50 metre freestyle at the 2020 Summer Olympics.

References

External links
 

1993 births
Living people
Nigerien male swimmers
Nigerien male freestyle swimmers
Olympic swimmers of Niger
Swimmers at the 2020 Summer Olympics
Place of birth missing (living people)
African Games competitors for Niger
Swimmers at the 2019 African Games
21st-century Nigerien people